Shantz is a surname. Notable people named Shantz include:

Billy Shantz (1927–1993), American baseball player
Bobby Shantz (born 1925), American baseball pitcher
Homer L. Shantz (1876–1958), American botanist
Jacob Yost Shantz (1822–1909), Canadian businessman
Jeff Shantz (born 1973), Canadian hockey player
Lorne Shantz (1920–1999), Canadian politician
Penny Shantz (Ryan) (born 1953), Canadian curler
Sarah Shantz-Smiley (born 1982), women's ice hockey coach
Susan Shantz (born 1957) Canadian sculptor
Viola Shelly Shantz (1895–1977), American zoologist

See also
Schantz (surname)
Schanz (surname)